Fayette County Airport may refer to:

 Fayette County Airport (Ohio) in Washington Court House, Ohio, United States
 Fayette County Airport (Tennessee) in Somerville, Tennessee, United States

See also
 Fayetteville Municipal Airport (disambiguation)